Australia is Like This is a 1945 documentary about the experiences of two American soldiers in Australia during World War II until they leave for battle. It takes the form of a letter written by one of the soldiers to his family in America describing Australia.

It was also known as A Letter from Australia.

Plot
The film is told in the form of a letter written by an American soldier and his friend on leave in Sydney. They leave a troopship and see the sights, encounter 'wrong side' traffic, and meet two Australian soldiers on leave who abandon their girlfriends to buy the Americans a beer. The Americans go to a Red Cross canteen and meet a waitress whose brother is in New Guinea. They take her to the zoo and accept a dinner invitation to her house. The troops then head north.

Cast
John McCallum as Australian soldier
Muriel Steinbeck
Grant Taylor as Australian soldier
Patricia Firman as waitress
John Nugent Hayward

Production
The film was one of a series of shorts made by Australia's Department of the Interior, others including Island Target.

Filming began late September 1944, using a predominantly American crew.

Release
The film was completed by January 1945.

References

External links
Australia is Like This at National Film and Sound Archive
Australia is Like This at Imperial War Museum
Extract of film at Australian War Memorial

Australian documentary films
1945 films
1945 documentary films